Dolno Nerezi is a neighbourhood in the City of Skopje, North Macedonia, administered by the Karpoš Municipality.

Demographics
In statistics gathered by Vasil Kanchov in 1900, the village was inhabited by 300 Muslim Albanians and 260 Orthodox Bulgarians. 

According to the 2002 census, the town had a total of 12,418 inhabitants. Ethnic groups in the town include:

Macedonians 10,288
Albanians 1,353
Serbs 378 
Turks 93
Vlachs 58
Romani 19
Bosniaks 14
Others 217

References

External links

Neighbourhoods in Karpoš Municipality
Neighbourhoods of Skopje
Albanian communities in North Macedonia